Maria Mitchell (/məˈraɪə/; August 1, 1818 – June 28, 1889) was an American astronomer, librarian, naturalist, and educator. In 1847, she discovered a comet named 1847 VI (modern designation C/1847 T1) that was later known as "Miss Mitchell's Comet" in her honor. She won a gold medal prize for her discovery, which was presented to her by King Christian VIII of Denmark in 1848. Mitchell was the first internationally known woman to work as both a professional astronomer and a professor of astronomy after accepting a position at Vassar College in 1865. She was also the first woman elected Fellow of the American Academy of Arts and Sciences and the American Association for the Advancement of Science.

Early years (1818–1846)

Maria Mitchell was born on August 1, 1818, on the island of Nantucket, Massachusetts, to Lydia Coleman Mitchell, a library worker, and William Mitchell, a schoolteacher and amateur astronomer.  The third of ten children, Mitchell and her siblings were raised in the Quaker religion, a faith with tenets valuing education and sensible work.  Her father educated all his children about nature and astronomy and her mother's employment at two libraries gave them access to a variety of knowledge. Mitchell particularly showed both an interest in and a talent for astronomy and advanced mathematics. Her father taught her to operate a number of astronomical instruments including chronometers, sextants, simple refracting telescopes, and Dolland telescopes. Mitchell often assisted her father in his work with local seamen and in his observations of the night sky.

Mitchell's parents, like other Quakers, valued education and insisted on giving her the same access to education as boys received. Her father was a dedicated public school teacher who pursued an interest in mathematics and astronomy, and he saw to it that Mitchell, who especially showed interest and talent, and all his children were indoctrinated with knowledge of astronomy. Additionally, Nantucket's importance as a whaling port meant that wives of sailors were left for months, sometimes years, to manage affairs at home while their husbands were at sea, thus fostering an atmosphere of relative independence and equality for the women who called the island home.

After attending Elizabeth Gardner small school in her earliest childhood years, Mitchell attended the North Grammar school, where William Mitchell was the first principal. Two years following the founding of that school, when she was 11 years old, her father founded his own school on Howard Street. There, she was a student and also a teaching assistant to her father. At home, her father taught her astronomy using his personal telescope. At age 12 1/2 she aided her father in calculating the exact moment of a solar eclipse, in 1831.

Her father's school closed, and afterwards she attended Unitarian minister Cyrus Peirce's school for young ladies until she was 16. Later, she worked for Peirce as his teaching assistant before she opened her own school in 1835. Mitchell developed experimental teaching methods, which she practiced in her future teaching positions. She made the decision to allow nonwhite children to attend her school, a controversial move as the local public school was still segregated at the time.

Mitchell began working as the first librarian of the Nantucket Atheneum in 1836 and held this position for 20 years. The institution's limited operating hours enabled her to assist her father with a series of astronomical observations and geographical calculations for the U.S. Coast Survey and to continue her own education. Mitchell and her father worked in a small observatory constructed on the roof of the Pacific Bank building with a four-inch equatorial telescope provided by the survey. In addition to looking for nebulae and double stars, the pair produced latitudes and longitudes by calculating the altitudes of stars and the culminations and occultations of the moon, respectively.

In 1843, Mitchell left the Quaker faith and began to follow Unitarian principles, although she did not physically attend a Unitarian Church until more than twenty years later. Her departure from the Quakers did not cause a break with her family, with whom she remained close.  We know little about this period, because few of her personal documents remain from before 1846. The Mitchell family believes she witnessed personal papers of fellow Nantucketers blown through the street by the Great Fire of 1846, and because fear of another fire persisted, she burned her own documents to keep them private.

Discovery of "Miss Mitchell's Comet" (1847–1849)

At 10:50 pm on the night of October 1, 1847, Mitchell discovered Comet 1847 VI (modern designation C/1847 T1) using a Dollond refracting telescope with three inches of aperture and forty-six inch focal length. She had noticed the unknown object flying through the sky in an area where she previously had not noticed any other activity and believed it to be a comet. The comet later became known as "Miss Mitchell's Comet". She published a notice of her discovery in Silliman's Journal in January 1848 under her father's name. The following month, she submitted her calculation of the comet's orbit, ensuring her claim as the original discoverer. Mitchell was celebrated at the Seneca Falls Convention for the discovery and calculation later that year.

On October 6, 1848, Mitchell was awarded a gold medal prize for her discovery by King Christian VIII of Denmark. This award had been previously established by King Frederick VI of Denmark  to honor the "first discoverer" of each new telescopic comet, a comet too faint to be seen with the naked eye. A question of credit temporarily arose because Francesco de Vico had independently discovered the same comet two days after Mitchell but reported it to European authorities first. The question was resolved in Mitchell's favor and she was awarded the prize. Her medal was inscribed with line 257 of Book I of Virgil's Georgics: "Non Frustra Signorum Obitus Speculamur et Ortus" (English: Not in vain do we watch the setting and the rising [of the stars]). The only previous women to discover a comet were the astronomers Caroline Herschel and Maria Margarethe Kirch. Though the award was sent via letter in 1848, Mitchell did not physically receive the award in Nantucket until March 1849. She became the first American to receive this medal and the first woman to receive an award in astronomy.

Intermediate years (1849–1864)
Mitchell became a celebrity following her discovery and awards, with hundreds of newspaper articles written about her in the subsequent decade. At her home in Nantucket, she entertained a number of prominent academics of the time such as Ralph Waldo Emerson, Herman Melville, Frederick Douglass, and Sojourner Truth. In 1849, Mitchell accepted a computing and field research position for the U.S. Coast Survey undertaken at the U.S. Nautical Almanac Office. Her work consisted of tracking the movements of the planets - particularly Venus - and compiling tables of their positions to assist sailors in navigation. She joined the American Association for the Advancement of Science in 1850 and befriended many of its members, including the director of the Smithsonian Institution, Joseph Henry.

Mitchell traveled to Europe in 1857. While abroad, Mitchell toured the observatories of contemporary European astronomers Sir John and Caroline Herschel and Mary Somerville. She also spoke with a number of natural philosophers including Alexander von Humboldt, William Whewell, and Adam Sedgewick before continuing her travels with Nathaniel Hawthorne and his family. Mitchell never married, but remained close to her immediate family throughout her life, even living in Lynn, Massachusetts with her sister Kate and her family in 1888.

Professorship at Vassar College (1865–1888)
Though Mitchell herself did not have a college education, she was appointed professor of astronomy at Vassar College by its founder, Matthew Vassar, in 1865 and became the first female professor of astronomy. Mitchell was the first person appointed to the faculty and was also named director of the Vassar College Observatory, a position she held for more than two decades. Mitchell also edited the astronomical column of Scientific American during her professorship. Thanks in part to Mitchell's guidance, Vassar College enrolled more students in mathematics and astronomy than Harvard University from 1865 to 1888. In 1869, Mitchell joined Mary Somerville and Elizabeth Cabot Agassiz in becoming some of the first women elected to the American Philosophical Society. Hanover College, Columbia University, and Rutgers Female College granted Mitchell honorary degrees.

Mitchell maintained many of her unconventional teaching methods in her classes: she reported neither grades nor absences; she advocated for small classes and individualized attention; and she incorporated technology and mathematics in her lessons.  Though her students' career options were limited, she never doubted the importance of their study of astronomy. "I cannot expect to make astronomers," she said to her students, "but I do expect that you will invigorate your minds by the effort at healthy modes of thinking. When we are chafed and fretted by small cares, a look at the stars will show us the littleness of our own interests".

Mitchell's own research interests were quite varied. She took pictures of planets, such as Jupiter and Saturn, as well as their moons, and she studied nebulae, double stars, and solar eclipses. Mitchell then developed theories around her observations, such as the revolution of one star around another in double star formations and the influence of distance and chemical composition in star color variation. Mitchell often involved her students with her astronomical observations in both the field and the Vassar College Observatory. Though she began recording sunspots by eye in 1868, she and her students began photographing them daily in 1873. These were the first regular photographs of the sun, and they allowed her to explore the hypothesis that sunspots were cavities rather than clouds on the surface of the sun. For the total solar eclipse of July 29, 1878 Mitchell and five assistants traveled with a 4-inch telescope to Denver for observations. Her efforts contributed to the success of Vassar's science and astronomy graduates, as twenty-five of her students would go on to be featured in Who's Who in America.

After teaching at Vassar for some time, she learned that despite her reputation and experience, her salary was less than that of many younger male professors. Mitchell and Alida Avery, the only other woman on the faculty at that time, insisted on a salary increase, and got it. She taught at the college until her retirement in 1888, one year before her death.

Social issues
In 1841, she attended the anti-slavery convention in Nantucket where Frederick Douglass made his first speech, and she also became involved in the anti-slavery movement by refusing to wear clothes made of Southern cotton. She later became involved in a number of social issues as a professor, particularly those pertaining to women's suffrage and education. She befriended various suffragists including Elizabeth Cady Stanton. After returning from a trip to Europe in 1873, Mitchell joined the national women's movement and helped found the Association for the Advancement of Women (AAW), a group dedicated to educational reform and the promotion of women in higher education. Mitchell addressed the Association's First Women's Congress in a speech titled The Higher Education of Women in which she described the work of English women working for access to higher education at Girton College, Cambridge. Mitchell advocated for women working part-time while acquiring their education to not only ease the wages off of men paying for their education, but also to empower more women to be in the workforce. She also called attention to the place for women in science and mathematics and encouraged others to support women's colleges and women's campaigns to serve on local school boards. Mitchell served as the second president of the AAW in 1875 and 1876 before stepping down to form and head a special Committee on Science to analyze and promote women's progress in the field.  She held this position until her death in 1889.

Death and legacy 
Mitchell died of brain disease on June 28, 1889, at the age of 70 in Lynn, Massachusetts. She was buried in Lot 411, in Prospect Hill Cemetery, Nantucket. An organization, the Maria Mitchell Association, was established in Nantucket to preserve the sciences on the island and Mitchell's work. The Association operates a Natural History museum, an Aquarium, a Science Library and Research Center, Maria Mitchell's Home Museum, and an Observatory named in her honor, the Maria Mitchell Observatory.

Mitchell was made a National Women's History Month Honoree for 1989 by the National Women's History Project and was inducted into the National Women's Hall of Fame in 1994. She was the namesake of a World War II Liberty ship, the SS Maria Mitchell, and New York's Metro North commuter railroad (with its Hudson Line endpoint in Poughkeepsie near Vassar College) has a train named the Maria Mitchell Comet. A crater on the moon was also named in her honor. On August 1, 2013, the search engine Google honored Maria Mitchell with a Google Doodle showing her in cartoon form on top of a roof gazing through a telescope in search of comets.

Her unique place at the intersection of American science and culture has been vividly captured in a number of recent publications.

Publications
During her life, Mitchell published seven items in the Royal Society Catalog and three articles detailing her observations in Silliman's Journal. Mitchell also authored three popular articles for Hours at Home, Century, and The Atlantic.

See also
List of astronomers
List of Christian thinkers in science
List of female scientists before the 21st century
Timeline of women in science

References

Online sources

 "Notice of a reward by the King of Denmark for the discovery of Comet", MNRAS 2 (1832) 59
 "Elements of Miss Mitchell's Comet", MNRAS 8 (1848) 130
 "Discontinuance of the King of Denmark's comet medal", AJ 1 (1850) 56 (due to First war of Schleswig)

Printed sources
 Kendall, Phebe Mitchell. Maria Mitchell: Life, Letters, and Journals. Boston: Lee & Shepard, 1896. (out of print; compiled by her sister)
 M. W. Whitney, In Memoriam, (Poughkeepsie, N. Y., 1889)
 M. K. Babbitt, Maria Mitchell as her students Knew her, (Poughkeepsie, N. Y., 1912)
 Albers, Henry editor "Maria Mitchell, A Life in Journals and Letters" College Avenue Press, Clinton Corners, NY, 2001.       (Henry Albers was the Fifth Maria Mitchell Professor of Astronomy at Vassar College.)
 Torjesen, Elizabeth Fraser, Comet Over Nantucket: Maria Mitchell and Her Island: The Story of America's First Woman Astronomer, (Richmond, IN: Friends United Press, 1984)
 Renée Bergland, Maria Mitchell and the Sexing of Science: An Astronomer Among the American Romantics, Beacon Press, Boston, 2008.
 Wright, Helen, Sweeper in the Skies: The Life of Maria Mitchell, College Avenue Press, Clinton Corners, NY, 1997. . (Commemorative Edition of 1949 edition. Wright was born in Washington, DC and served as assistant in Astronomy Dept. at Vassar and later US Naval Observatory and Mt. Wilson Observatory.Wrote bios of Geo. Hale and Palomar Observatory & w. Harold Shapley co-ed of Treasury of Science)

External links

 Encyclopædia Britannica biographical information

 Maria Mitchell Association 
 Unitarian Universalist Biography of Maria Mitchell
 Prospect Hill Cemetery
 Bibliography from the Astronomical Society of the Pacific
 Episode 5: Maria Mitchell from Babes of Science podcasts
 
Michals, Debra. "Maria Mitchell". National Women's History Museum. 2015.
Vassar Telescope located at Smithsonian National Museum of American History

1818 births
1889 deaths
American women astronomers
American Quakers
American Unitarians
Discoverers of comets
Fellows of the American Academy of Arts and Sciences
Members of the American Philosophical Society
People from Nantucket, Massachusetts
Vassar College faculty
19th-century American astronomers
19th-century American women scientists
Hall of Fame for Great Americans inductees
American suffragists
American women academics